Steve Ma Jingtao (born 14 February 1962) is a Taiwanese actor best known for acting in many Taiwanese, mainland Chinese and Singaporean television series since the early 1990s. Most of the more notable television series he acted in are of the wuxia and historical drama genres. Some of his notable roles in television series include: Zhang Wuji in The Heaven Sword and Dragon Saber (1994); Lü Dongbin in Legend of the Eight Immortals (1999); Linghu Chong in The Legendary Swordsman (2000); Dorgon in Xiaozhuang Mishi (2002); Nurhaci in Taizu Mishi (2005); King Zhou of Shang in The Legend and the Hero (2007).

Early life
Ma was born and raised in Taichung County, Taiwan, as the second of four children in his family. His ancestral home is in Suizhong County, Liaoning, China. He attended National Taichung Second Senior High School and graduated from Taipei World News Vocational School's Department of Radio and Television with a certificate in journalism.

Career
Ma started his acting career by appearing in minor roles in Taiwanese television series such as The Former Husband, The Morning Fog and Guilty, before making his film debut in Spring Swallow in 1989. In the same year, he was nominated for the Golden Bell Award for Best Actor for portraying Zhang Changgui in Spring Come Again After Leave. He was nominated for the Golden Bell Award for Best Actor again in 1990 for his role as Luo Zhigang in Xue Ke.

In 1994, Ma starred as Zhang Wuji alongside Hong Kong actresses Kathy Chow and Cecilia Yip in the Taiwanese wuxia television series The Heaven Sword and Dragon Saber, an adaptation of the wuxia novel of the same title by Louis Cha. In 1998, he portrayed Lü Dongbin, one of the Eight Immortals in Chinese mythology, in the Singaporean television series Legend of the Eight Immortals. In 2000, he starred as Linghu Chong in the Singaporean television series The Legendary Swordsman, an adaptation of the wuxia novel The Smiling, Proud Wanderer by Louis Cha.

Ma became more prominent in television after portraying the Qing dynasty regent Dorgon in the 2002 Chinese historical television series  Xiaozhuang Mishi, which reached the top position in viewership when it was aired in mainland China and Taiwan. In 2003, he portrayed the Qing dynasty prince Yunreng in Huang Taizi Mishi. He starred as Nurhaci, the founder of the Qing dynasty, in the 2005 Chinese television series Taizu Mishi.

In 2007, Ma starred as the antagonist King Zhou of Shang in The Legend and the Hero, a 2007 Chinese television series adapted from the 16th century Chinese mythological fantasy novel Fengshen Yanyi. In 2012, he appeared as King Fuchai of Wu in the Chinese historical television series The Legend of Xishi.

Personal life
Ma was twice married. His first marriage was to Tang Yun and they have a daughter, Ma Shiyuan (born 1991). After divorcing Tang in 1993, he married Chinese actress Wu Jia'ni in 2007; the couple divorced in 2017. They have two children, Ma Shitian and Ma Shixin.

Filmography

Film

Television

Theater

Awards and nominations

References

External links
 
 
 

1962 births
Male actors from Taichung
Living people
Taiwanese male film actors
Taiwanese male television actors
20th-century Taiwanese male actors
21st-century Taiwanese male actors
Manchu male actors
Taiwanese people of Manchu descent